Sawtooth may refer to:

Science and technology
 Tooth of a saw blade (original meaning)
 Sawtooth wave, a type of waveform
 Sawtooth (cellular automaton)
 Tokamak sawtooth, a phenomenon in plasma physics
 Sawtooth, code name for the Power Mac G4
 Sawtooth coriander, a herb also called Culantro
 Sawtooth  eel 
 Sawtooth Software

Arts and media
 Sawtooth (film), a 2004 American thriller and drama film
 Sawtooth (album), an album by British electronic musician Jonny L

Places
 The Sawtooth, between Mount Evans and Mount Bierstadt in Colorado, United States
 Sawtooth Bridges, rail viaducts on Northeast Corridor in Kearny, New Jersey
 Sawtooth City, Idaho, United States
 Sawtooth National Forest, Idaho, United States
 Sawtooth National Recreation Area, Idaho, United States
 Sawtooth Wilderness, Idaho, United States

See also
 Sawtooth Range (disambiguation)